Sainte-Brigitte is a commune in the Morbihan department of Brittany in north-western France.

Population
Inhabitants of Sainte-Brigitte are called in French Brigittois. The population declined quickly after the first world war. The population is steady since 1982.

Geography

The village is situated at the heart of a hilly and forest-covered region called the Forest of Quenecan.

Map

History

The main activity in the village was the forges in the last centuries. The activity declined quickly at the end of the nineteenth century and the forges closed in 1880.

Gallery

See also
Communes of the Morbihan department

References

External links

 Mayors of Morbihan Association 

Saintebrigitte